Hugh (13 May 1024 – 29 April 1109), sometimes called Hugh the Great or Hugh of Semur, was the Abbot of Cluny from 1049 until his death. He was one of the most influential leaders of the monastic orders from the Middle Ages.

Biography

Hugh was descended from the noblest families in Burgundy. He was the eldest son of Seigneur Dalmas I of Semur and Aremberge of Vergy, daughter of Henry I, Duke of Burgundy.

His father wanted him to be a knight. But at the age of fifteen, he took his monastic vows and later became an abbot. 

Abbot Hugh built the third abbey church at Cluny, the largest structure in Europe for many centuries, with funds provided by Ferdinand I of León. He was the driving force behind the Cluniac monastic movement during the last quarter of the 11th century, which had priories throughout southern France and northern Spain.

Political influence
Hugh's relationship to Ferdinand I and Alfonso VI of León and Castile included the release of Alfonso from his brother Sancho's prison. His influence upon Pope Urban II, who had been prior at Cluny under Hugh, made Hugh one of the most powerful and influential figures of the late 11th century. 

As the godfather of the Holy Roman Emperor, Henry IV, he also played a role as a mediator during the conflict between Pope Gregory VII and Henry IV, though he was not successful. Additionally, he was an active diplomat to Germany and Hungary on behalf of the church. He died on 28 April 1109. Many of his relics were pillaged or destroyed by the Huguenots in 1575.

After Clementia of Burgundy was married, she gave Hugh the Flemish monastery of St. Bertin. This act spread the Cluniac order north of the Loire and initiated monastic reform in Flanders.

His feast day is April 29.

References

Sources

External links
Catholic Encyclopedia: St. Hugh the Great

French abbots
1024 births
1109 deaths
Cluniacs
12th-century Christian saints
Medieval French saints
House of Damas